Sidney Mason (1886–1923) was an American film actor active during the silent era. He was the father of the actor Sydney Mason.

Selected filmography
 His Neighbor's Wife (1913)
 The Daughter of MacGregor (1916)
 The Honor of Mary Blake (1916)
 The Peddler (1917)
 Susan's Gentleman (1917)
 The Little Terror (1917)
 The Painted Madonna (1917)
 Little Miss Nobody (1917)
 The Boy Girl (1917)
 Bonnie Annie Laurie (1918)
 The Prussian Cur (1918)
 The Forbidden Path (1918)
 A Fallen Idol (1919)
 A Modern Salome (1920)
 The Good-Bad Wife (1920)

References

Bibliography
 Langman, Larry. American Film Cycles: The Silent Era. Greenwood Publishing, 1998.

External links

American male film actors
1886 births
1923 deaths
People from Paterson, New Jersey